87 Hackford Road is an early drawing by Vincent van Gogh of the house at that address, where he lived while working in London. It was only recognised as his work in 1973.

Background 

Van Gogh lodged at the home of Ursula Loyer and her daughter Eugenie, at 87 Hackford Road, Stockwell, London, England, from August 1873, while working at the art dealership Goupil & Co.

He sketched the 1824-built, three-storey Georgian terrace including the house, opposite Durand School, using pencil with chalk highlights. He lettered the wall "Hackford Road" and the gate "".

Discovery 

In 1973, while researching an article on van Gogh, the journalist Ken Wilkie visited Eugenie's granddaughter, Kathleen Maynard, at her home in Devon, England. While she was showing him photographs of the Loyers and their house, he noticed a dusty, tea- or coffee- stained drawing in the box in which the photographs were kept. Maynard recalled that her father said it had been drawn by "one of my [Maynard's] Grandmother's lodgers" and "it's been up in the attic as long as I can remember".

Wilkie recognised it as depicting the house in Hackford Road, and being potentially Van Gogh's work. With Maynard's blessing, he took it to Amsterdam, where Dr Hans Jaffé, an authority on the artist working at the University of Amsterdam, authenticated it. The final paragraph of Jaffé's report read:

Display 

Maynard lent the drawing to the Van Gogh Museum in Amsterdam, for its reopening in 1973, and it remained in their care for over three decades, during which time it was exhibited there, and at the Kröller-Müller Museum and at the Barbican Centre in London. Maynard died in 2000, and in 2005 her daughter Anne Shaw requested its return; and so it remains in the possession of the original family.

References 

Vincent van Gogh
19th-century drawings